Dynastes hyllus is a large scarab beetle species that ranges from Mexico to Guatemala. Its larvae have been found to associate with the logs of Persea americana.

Taxonomy
There were two subspecies recognized, D. hyllus hyllus and D. hyllus moroni, but subsequent genetic analyses clearly indicate that they are unrelated to one another; D. hyllus hyllus is sister to Dynastes grantii, while D. hyllus moroni is sister to Dynastes maya, so moroni is presently considered a separate species.

References

Dynastinae
Beetles of North America
Beetles described in 1843